The Zila Panchayat or District Development Council or Mandal Parishad or District Panchayat is the third tier of the Panchayati Raj system and functions at the district levels in all states. A Zila Parishad is an elected body. Block Pramukh of Block Panchayat are also represented in Zila Parishad. The members of the State Legislature and the members of the Parliament of India are members of the Zila Parishad. The Zila parishad acts as the link between the state government and the village-level Gram Panchayat.

Zila Parishad are Panchayats at Apex or District Level in Panchayat Raj Institutions, and Gram Panchayat is the base unit at village level in Panchayati Raj Institutions.

The 73rd Amendment is about Governments (which are also known as Panchayati Raj Institutions 
 Panchayat at District (or apex) Level
 Panchayat at Intermediate Level
 Panchayat at Base Level

Composition

The chairmen of all the Panchayat Samitis under the district are the ex officio members of Zila Parishad. The parishad is headed by a president and a vice-president.

The deputy chief executive officer from General Administration department at district level is ex-officio secretary of Zila Parishad.

The chief executive officer, who is an IAS officer or senior state service officer, heads the administrative setup of the Zila Parishad. He/ She supervises the divisions of the parishad and is assisted by deputy CEOs and other officials at district- and block-level officers.

Administrative structure
The chief executive officer (CEO), who is a civil servant  under IAS or  State Administrative  Service''' cadre, heads the administrative machinery of the Zila Parishad. He is also nominated by the government. He may also be district magistrate in some states. The CEO supervises the divisions of the parishad and executes its development schemes.

 Function 
 The Zila Parishad is an official body that coordinates the activities of the Panchayats in all its developmental activities,such as minor irrigation works, vocational and industrial schools, village industries, sanitation and public health among others.
It advises the State Government on all matters relating to the Gram Panchayats and Panchayat Samitis under its supervision and the needs of the rural population living therein.
It also supervises the work of the Panchayats. It also scrutinizes the budget estimates of Panchayat Samitis in some states like Assam,Bihar and Punjab.
It functions mostly through various Standing Committees, which oversee and coordinate the common programmes of the villages under its jurisdiction.

 Sources of income 
taxes on water, pilgrimage, markets, etc. Fixed grant from the State Government in proportion with the land revenue and money for works and schemes assigned to the Parishad. The Zila Parishad can collect some money from the panchayats with the approval of the government.

See also
Gram panchayat

 References 

 Our Civic Life (Civics and Administration)'' Maharashtra State Bureau of Textbook Production and Curriculum Research, Pune

Panchayati raj (India)